Yawar Waqaq (Hispanicized spellings Yahuar Huacac, Yáhuar Huácac) or Yawar Waqaq Inka was the seventh Sapa Inca of the Kingdom of Cusco (beginning around CE 1380) and the second of the Hanan dynasty.

His father was Inca Roca (Inka Ruq'a).  Yawar's wife was Mama Chicya (or Chu-Ya) and their sons were Paucar Ayllu and Pahuac Hualpa Mayta.  Yawar's name refers to a story that he was abducted as a child by the Sinchi (Warlord) Tocay Ccapac of the Ayarmaca nation, crying tears of blood over his predicament. He eventually escaped with the help of one of his captor's mistresses, Chimpu Orma.  Assuming the reign at the age of 19, Yawar conquered Pillauya, Choyca, Yuco, Chillincay, Taocamarca and Cavinas.

Notes

References

Inca emperors
Year of death unknown
Year of birth unknown
14th-century monarchs in South America
15th-century monarchs in South America